McClellan is a surname. Notable people with the surname include:

Antwan McClellan, American politician
Barr McClellan, Texas lawyer and author, father of Mark and Scott McClellan
Beverly McClellan (1969–2018), American singer and contestant in the first season of the American TV series The Voice
Brian McClellan, American writer of fantasy
C. M. S. McLellan (1865–1916), American playwright and composer, also wrote as Hugh Morton
Edwin North McClellan (1881–1971), United States Marine Corps officer, author, and historian
George McClellan (New York politician) (1856–1927), U.S. Representative from New York
George McClellan (physician) (1796–1847), surgeon and founder of Jefferson Medical College in Philadelphia, Pennsylvania
George McClellan (police officer) (1908–1982), Commissioner of the Royal Canadian Mounted Police
George B. McClellan (1826–1885), American Civil War general and creator of the Army of the Potomac
George B. McClellan Jr. (1865–1940), Mayor of New York City and U.S. Representative from New York
George Marion McClellan (1860-1934), American writer
Gerald McClellan American former professional boxer 
James E. McClellan (1926–2016), American veterinarian and politician
James H. McClellan, mathematician and electronic engineer, professor at Georgia Institute of Technology
John McClellan (chemist) (1810–1881), English chemist and industrialist
John Little McClellan (1896–1977), U.S. Senator from Arkansas
Joseph McClellan (1746–1834), American soldier and politician
Katherine Elizabeth McClellan (1859-1934), American photographer
Mark McClellan (born 1963), Medicare and FDA official
Mike McLellan (born 1981), Canadian indoor lacrosse player
Peter McClellan, Australian jurist
Robert McClellan (1806–1860), U.S. Representative from New York
Robert McClellan (New York treasurer) (1747–1817), treasurer of New York state
Robert H. McClellan (1823–1902), Illinois state senator
Samuel McClellan (1730–1807), brigadier general in the American Revolutionary War
Scott McClellan (born 1968), former White House press secretary
Sid McClellan (1925–2000), footballer who played for Tottenham Hotspur, Portsmouth and Leyton Orient.
Stephen T. McClellan, Wall Street analyst, author

Fictional characters:
Clarisse McClellan, a character in Fahrenheit 451 by Ray Bradbury
"Mrs. McClellan," a character without a first name in Ray Bradbury's story "There Will Come Soft Rains."

See also
McClellan Air Force Base
McClellan's General Store, listed on the National Register of Historic Places in Henry County, Iowa
McClellan Park, California, a census-designated place near Sacramento
McClellan–Palomar Airport in Carlsbad, California 
McClellan Magnet High School in Little Rock, Arkansas 
The McClellan saddle, used in the late 19th century by U.S. Army cavalry
USAT McClellan, a US Army Transport ship active during the Spanish-American and First World Wars
McLellan
Clan MacLellan, Scottish clan